is a lighthouse located on the island of Jōgashima in the city of Miura, Kanagawa Prefecture, Japan, off the southernmost and western tip of Miura Peninsula, facing Sagami Bay. It is the fourth oldest western style lighthouse to be built in Japan, and the second oldest surviving to the present day.

History 
The Jōgashima Lighthouse was one of eight lighthouses built in Japan under the provisions of the Anglo-Japanese Treaty of Amity and Commerce of 1858, signed by the Bakumatsu period Tokugawa Shogunate. The lighthouse was designed and constructed by expatriate French engineer Léonce Verny. Verny constructed another three lighthouses around Tokyo Bay, and was also the engineer who built the nearby Yokosuka Naval Arsenal during his career in Japan.

The Jōgashima Lighthouse was completed on September 8, 1870, after the Meiji Restoration, and was originally built of brick. The original structure was destroyed during the Great Kantō earthquake on September 1, 1923, and was replaced with the current reinforced-concrete round structure on August 1, 1925. In 1928, its light source was changed from acetylene to electric, greatly increasing its visibility.  The lighthouse has been unmanned since 1991.  It is currently maintained by the Japan Coast Guard.

See also 

 List of lighthouses in Japan

References 
Pedlar, Neil. The Imported Pioneers: Westerners who Helped Build Modern Japan. Routledge, 1990.

Notes

External links 
  Lighthouses in Japan  

Lighthouses completed in 1870
Lighthouses completed in 1925
Buildings and structures in Kanagawa Prefecture
Lighthouses in Japan
1870 establishments in Japan
1925 establishments in Japan
Miura, Kanagawa